Cycnoches, abbreviated as Cyc. in the horticultural trade, is a genus of 34 currently accepted species of orchids native to South America, Central America and southern Mexico. Also called "swan orchids", they are epiphytes found in lowland and pre-montane forests.

List of species
Species accepted as of May 2014:

 Cycnoches aureum Lindl. & Paxton  (1852) - Costa Rica, Honduras, Panama
 Cycnoches barthiorum G.F.Carr & Christenson  (1999) - Colombia
 Cycnoches bennettii Dodson   (1989) - Peru
 Cycnoches brachydactylon Schltr.  (1924) - Colombia
 Cycnoches carrii Christenson  (1999) - Peru
 Cycnoches chlorochilon Klotzsch  (1838) - Panama, Colombia, Venezuela, Brazil, French Guiana 
 Cycnoches christensonii D.E.Benn.  (1998) - Peru
 Cycnoches cooperi Rolfe  (1913) - Peru, Brazil
 Cycnoches densiflorum Rolfe  (1909) - Colombia
 Cycnoches dianae Rchb.f.  (1852) - Panama
 Cycnoches egertonianum Bateman  (1842) - southern Mexico, Central America
 Cycnoches farnsworthianum D.E.Benn. & Christenson  (2001) - Peru
 Cycnoches glanduliferum Rolfe  (1892) - southern Mexico, Central America
 Cycnoches guttulatum Schltr.  (1922) - Costa Rica, Nicaragua, Panama 
 Cycnoches haagii Barb.Rodr.  (1881) - from Colombia to French Guiana, south to Bolivia and Brazil
 Cycnoches herrenhusanum Jenny & G.A.Romero  (1991) - Colombia, Ecuador
 Cycnoches jarae Dodson & D.E.Benn.  (1989) - Peru
 Cycnoches lehmannii Rchb.f.  (1878) - Ecuador, Peru
 Cycnoches loddigesii Lindl.  (1832) - from Colombia to French Guiana, south to Brazil
 Cycnoches lusiae G.A.Romero & Garay  (1999) - Venezuela 
 Cycnoches maculatum Lindl.  (1840) - Colombia, Venezuela
 Cycnoches manoelae P.Castro & Campacci  (1993) - Brazil 
 Cycnoches pachydactylon Schltr.  (1922) - Nicaragua, Panama
 Cycnoches pentadactylon Lindl. (1843) - Peru, Brazil
 Cycnoches peruvianum Rolfe  (1891) - Ecuador, Peru
 Cycnoches powellii Schltr.   (1922) - Panama
 Cycnoches quatuorcristis D.E.Benn.  (1992) - Peru
 Cycnoches rossianum Rolfe  (1891) - Costa Rica
 Cycnoches schmidtianum Christenson & G.F.Carr  (2001) - Peru
 Cycnoches stenodactylon Schltr.  (1922) - Panama
 Cycnoches suarezii Dodson  (1989) - Ecuador 
 Cycnoches thurstoniorum Dodson  (1989) - Colombia, Venezuela, Ecuador
 Cycnoches ventricosum Bateman  (1838) - Mexico, Central America
 Cycnoches warszewiczii Rchb.f.  (1852) - Costa Rica, Nicaragua, Panama

References

  (1832) The Genera and Species of Orchidaceous Plants 154.
  (Eds)  (2009) Genera Orchidacearum Volume 5: Epidendroideae (Part 2): Epidendroideae, 21 ff. Oxford: Oxford University Press.

External links

 
Catasetinae genera